The player draft for the 2012 Sri Lanka Premier League was held on 5 July 2012 for international players and on 6 July for local players. 56 international players were drafted and comprised mostly Australian and Pakistani players. 107 local players were drafted.

Drafted local players

Drafted international players

References

External links
Official website

Sri Lanka Premier League
2012 in Sri Lankan cricket